Devonport Naval Heritage Centre, formerly known as the Plymouth Naval Base Museum is a maritime museum in Plymouth, Devon.

It is under development at HMNB Devonport, one of the three main bases of the Royal Navy, and its mission statement is "To present the story of support to the Royal Navy at Plymouth since the days of Edward I."

It is housed in a number of historic buildings within the South Yard of the Royal Dockyard site and is open to the public by appointment.

See also
 National Museum of the Royal Navy
 Plymouth City Museum and Art Gallery

References

External links
 Devonport Naval Heritage Centre - official site
 HMNB Devonport web page

Museums in Plymouth, Devon
Naval museums in England